Arif Rasidi (born 6 August 1980) is a French badminton player originally from Indonesia, and was part of the Indonesia national team from 1999 to 2001. He was a former World Junior bronze medalist in 1998, French national coach and now works as a coach in CLTO Badminton Orléans. Rasidi won men's singles titles at the 2003 Dutch International, and 2005 Portuguese International. His wife, Weny Rahmawati, also a former badminton player and now works in CLTO.

Achievements

World Junior Championships 
Boys' singles

IBF International 
Men's singles

Men's doubles

References

External links 
 

1980 births
Living people
Indonesian male badminton players
French male badminton players
Badminton coaches